Carmelo Morales Erostarbe (4 December 1930 – 28 April 2003) was a Spanish professional racing cyclist. He rode in seven editions of the Tour de France.

References

External links
 

1930 births
2003 deaths
Spanish male cyclists
People from Enkarterri
Sportspeople from Biscay
Cyclists from the Basque Country (autonomous community)